Lisa Hurtig ( Lantz; born 26 August 1987) is a Swedish footballer who played for Linköpings FC.

Honours

Club
Linköpings FC
Damallsvenskan:
 Champion: 2017

Personal
She married Lina Hurtig, a teammate at Linköpings FC and also a member of the Sweden women's national football team. In March 2021 Lisa announced she was pregnant with the couple's first child.

References

External links 
 
  (archive)
  (archive)
 Lisa Lantz at Linköpings FC 

1987 births
Living people
Swedish women's footballers
Umeå IK players
Linköpings FC players
Bälinge IF players
Damallsvenskan players
Women's association football defenders
LGBT association football players
Swedish LGBT sportspeople
Sundsvalls DFF players